It is a small village located 12KM North from Tiruchirapalli District head quarters, 9KM from Manachanellur & 347KM from the Chennai State capital.

Pukkathurai Pin code is 621213. 

Pukkathurai is a village located in the Indian state of Tamil Nadu.

Villages in Tiruchirappalli district